Arthur Patrick Townsend (April 30, 1921 – February 13, 1989) was an American publisher, activist, and real estate developer. Best known for founding the Precinct Reporter, a weekly newspaper, he was a leading figure in the African-American community in San Bernardino, California.

References 

20th-century American newspaper publishers (people)
20th-century American newspaper founders
1921 births
1989 deaths
Activists from California
African-American activists
Real estate and property developers
African-American press